is a Japanese footballer who plays as a midfielder for J2 League club Oita Trinita.

Club statistics
Updated to 18 February 2019.

References

External links
Profile at Kashiwa Reysol

 J.League profile
 

1994 births
Living people
Japanese footballers
Association football people from Saitama Prefecture
J1 League players
J2 League players
J3 League players
Shonan Bellmare players
Kashiwa Reysol players
J.League U-22 Selection players
Kyoto Sanga FC players
Association football midfielders
Japan youth international footballers